White Colne is a village and parish in Essex, England, on the north side of the River Colne, opposite Earls Colne, and on the Colchester road,  East South East of Halstead. It traces its history back to the Domesday Book and beyond. There is evidence of Palaeolithic and Mesolithic settlement in the area. White Colne railway station was a station on the Colne Valley and Halstead Railway.

The village church is dedicated to St Andrew. The German film actor Anton Diffring is buried in the churchyard.

References

External links 

 White Colne Parish Council website
 British History Online: History of White Colne

Villages in Essex
Braintree District